Cognitive functions, also referred to as psychological functions, as described by Carl Jung in his book Psychological Types, are particular mental processes within a person's psyche that are present regardless of common circumstance. This is a concept that serves as one of the foundations for his theory on personality type. In his book, he noted four main psychological functions: thinking, feeling, sensation and intuition. He introduced them with having either an internally focused (introverted) or externally focused (extraverted) tendency which he called "attitudes". He also categorizes the functions as either rational (thinking and feeling) or irrational (intuition and sensation).

Psychological functions and attitudes 

The four psychological functions may be subjugated to the control of consciousness, which can take two attitudes:
 Extraversion: "a strong, if not exclusive, determination by the object." Consciously, in an extravert, the four basic cognitive functions follow the extraverted 'general attitude of consciousness': "Now, when the orientation to the object and to objective facts is so predominant that the most frequent and essential decisions and actions are determined, not by subjective values but by objective relations, one speaks of an extraverted attitude. When this is habitual, one speaks of an extraverted type. If a man so thinks, feels, and acts, in a word so lives, as to correspond directly with objective conditions and their claims, whether in a good sense or ill, he is extraverted."
 Introversion: "a turning inwards of the libido, whereby a negative relation of subject to object is expressed. Interest does not move towards the object, but recedes towards the subject." Consciously, in an introvert, the four basic cognitive functions follow the introverted 'general attitude of consciousness'. "Everyone whose attitude is introverted thinks, feels, and acts in a way that clearly demonstrates that the subject is the chief factor of motivation while the object at most receives only a secondary value."

The difference between extraversion and introversion comes from the source of the decisive factor in forming motivation and developing ideas, whether it is objective (i.e. the external environment) or subjective (experienced within the mind, or "processes inherent in the psyche"). When discussing function types, Jung ascribed movements of the libido in both directions for each function in each function type, but with one direction being that final judge.

To summarize Jung's views, as discussed in Psychological Types and maintained until his death, Jung posited that each individual follows a "general attitude of consciousness" where every conscious act is directed by the tendency to follow introversion for introverts and extraversion for extraverts. Jung's definition of the general attitude was not limiting the individual from experiencing the opposing attitude, but offers the "decisive determination". The primary, or most developed, differentiated, and conscious function, is entirely positioned in the service of the conscious attitude of introversion or extraversion, but even if all other functions can be conscious and made to follow the general attitude, they are of less differentiation and are hence strongly affected by the opposing attitude of the unconscious. Later in the book, Jung describes the auxiliary function as being capable of some significant development or differentiation, if it remains less differentiated of that of the primary. His views on the primary and auxiliary functions both being of enough differentiation to be considered conscious and set aside with the primary as opposed to the most inferior two functions can be noted as early as Psychological Types.

The four basic psychological functions, thinking, feeling, sensation, and intuition are "basic functions" that can be briefly defined as follows.

Thinking 
According to Jung, thinking is "that psychological function which, in accordance with its own laws, brings given presentations into conceptual connection." Jung said that the thinking function should be delegated solely to 'active thinking' in contrast to 'passive thinking'. According to him, active thinking uses concepts to connect information, being considered judgement as a result. He writes that passive thinking "lacks any sense of direction", since it is not in accordance with an aim. He refers to it as 'intuitive thinking' instead.

Later, some interpreted Jung's extraverted thinking and introverted thinking to mean other than the function of thought as represented in extraverts and introverts respectively. In Adler and Hull's translation of Jung's Psychological Types, Jung states:

"Apart from the qualities I have mentioned, the undeveloped functions possess the further peculiarity that, when the conscious attitude is introverted, they are extraverted and vice versa. One could therefore expect to find extraverted feelings in an introverted intellectual..."

Extraverted thinking 
Extraverted thinking is the thinking function that is objective (being extraverted). Extraverted thinking often places information such as facts in high order; it is a process that is concerned with organisation and hierarchy of phenomena.

"In accordance with his definition, we must picture a, man whose constant aim -- in so far, of course, as he is a [p. 435] pure type -- is to bring his total life-activities into relation with intellectual conclusions, which in the last resort are always orientated by objective data, whether objective facts or generally valid ideas. This type of man gives the deciding voice-not merely for himself alone but also on behalf of his entourage-either to the actual objective reality or to its objectively orientated, intellectual formula. By this formula are good and evil measured, and beauty and ugliness determined. All is right that corresponds with this formula; all is wrong that contradicts it; and everything that is neutral to it is purely accidental."

Introverted thinking 
Introverted thinking is the thinking function that is subjective (being introverted). The nature of introverted thinking means that it is primarily concerned with its "subjective idea" and insights gained by formulation over facts and objective data. Whereas Extraverted Thinking is most like Empiricism, Introverted Thinking is most similar to Rationalism. 

"Just as Darwin might possibly represent the normal extraverted thinking type, so we might point to Kant as a counter-example of the normal introverted thinking type. The former speaks with facts; the latter appeals to the subjective factor. Darwin ranges over the wide fields of objective facts, while Kant restricts himself to a critique of knowledge in general. But suppose a Cuvier be contrasted with a Nietzsche: the antithesis becomes even sharper."

"The introverted thinking type is characterized by a priority of the thinking I have just described. Like his [p. 485] extraverted parallel, he is decisively influenced by ideas; these, however, have their origin, not in the objective data but in the subjective foundation. Like the extravert, he too will follow his ideas, but in the reverse direction: inwardly not outwardly. Intensity is his aim, not extensity. In these fundamental characters he differs markedly, indeed quite unmistakably from his extraverted parallel. Like every introverted type, he is almost completely lacking in that which distinguishes his counter type, namely, the intensive relatedness to the object."

Feeling
Jung defined feeling as "primarily a process that takes place between the ego and a given content, a process, moreover, that imparts to the content a definite value in the sense of acceptance or rejection [...] Hence feeling is also a kind of judging, differing, however, from an intellectual judgment, in that it does not aim at establishing an intellectual connection but is solely concerned with the setting up of a subjective criterion of acceptance or rejection." Also Jung made distinctions between feeling as a judging function, and emotions (affect): "Feeling is distinguished from affect by the fact that it gives rise to no perceptible physical innervation's." Von Franz wrote that there are "clichés" with regard to the feeling function, which are that musicians and people with "good eros" are feeling types. She also wrote that another cliché was the notion that woman are better at feeling "just because they are women".
Later, some interpreted Jung's extraverted feeling and introverted feeling to mean other than the function of feeling as represented in extraverts and introverts respectively.

Extraverted feeling 
Overall, extraverted feeling is concerned with phenomena to be harmonious with its external environment. Jung writes of extraverted feelers as those where feeling "loses its personal character -- it becomes feeling per se; it almost seems as though the personality were wholly dissolved in the feeling of the moment. Now, since actual life situations constantly and successively alternate, in which the feeling-tones released are not only different but are actually mutually contrasting, the personality inevitably becomes dissipated in just so many different feelings."

Introverted feeling 
Introverted feeling is "very hard to elucidate since so little of it is openly displayed." Jung writes of feeling in introverted feelers: "[Introverted feeling] is continually seeking an image which has no existence in reality, but which it has seen in a kind of vision. It glides over all objects that do not fit in with its aim. It strives after inner intensity, for which the objects serve at most as a stimulus. The depth of this feeling can only be guessed—it can never be clearly grasped. It makes people silent and difficult to access; it shrinks back like a violet from the brute nature of the object in order to fill the depths of the subject. It comes out with negative judgments or assumes an air of profound indifference as a means of defense." Introverted Feeling can therefore be thought of as subjective, personal ideals and values, that the person protects and defends against the thoughts and judgements of others.

Sensation
Jung presented sensation as "that psychological function which transmits a physical stimulus to perception. [...] not only to the outer stimuli, but also to the inner, i.e. to changes in the internal organs. Primarily, therefore, sensation is sense-perception, i.e. perception transmitted via the sense organs and 'bodily senses' (kinaesthetic, vaso-motor sensation, etc.)." Also, since the process of conscious perception is a psychological phenomenon representing a physical phenomenon, and not the physical phenomenon itself, he adds: "On the one hand, it is an element of presentation, since it transmits to the presenting function the perceived image of the outer object; on the other hand, it is an element of feeling, because through the perception of bodily changes it lends the character of affect to feeling."

Extraverted sensation 
Extraverted sensation is the sensing function that perceives sensations from the external world in an objective manner. For example, since an extraverted sensors type's source of reward gravitates around perceiving and feeling external phenomena, he often has a good sense of aesthetic — whether this be the taste of food, or a new trend in clothing. Extraverted Sensors may be more attuned with spatial awareness and physical reality. Note that a bodily sensation is still considered extraverted sensing, as the sensation is being perceived in objective reality. Such as, drinking caffeine will objectively create a stimulating sensation in the person’s physiology. This is contrasted to the subjective sensor who may be concerned with a subjective response to the same drink (e.g. nostalgia that is tied to that specific cup of coffee, or whether or not they prefer the flavor).

Introverted sensation 
Introverted sensation is the sensing function that perceives phenomena in such a way as extraverted sensation does above, but in a subjective manner. Jung wrote that "the subject perceives the same things as everybody else, only, he never stops at the purely objective effect, but concerns himself with the subjective perception released by the objective stimulus. Subjective perception differs remarkably from the objective. It is either not found at all in the object, or, at most, merely suggested by it[...] Subjective sensation apprehends the background of the physical world rather than its surface. The decisive thing is not the reality of the object, but the reality of the subjective factor, i.e. the primordial images, which in their totality represent a psychic mirror-world. It is a mirror, however, with the peculiar capacity of representing the present contents of consciousness not in their known and customary form but in a certain sense sub specie aeternitatis, somewhat as a million-year old consciousness might see them. Such a consciousness would see the becoming and the passing of things beside their present and momentary existence, and not only that, but at the same time it would also see that Other, which was before their becoming and will be after their passing hence."

Introverted sensation also perceives things in a very detailed manner, as per Emma Jung.

Intuition 
Intuition is also presented as a basic psychological function as hunches and visions provide an alternative means of perception to sensation: "It is that psychological function which transmits perceptions in an unconscious way. Everything, whether outer or inner objects or their associations, can be the object of this perception. Intuition has this peculiar quality: it is neither sensation, nor feeling, nor intellectual conclusion, although it may appear in any of these forms."

Extraverted intuition 

Extraverted Intuition takes in intuitive information from the world around. Whereas Introverted Intuition refers to Jung’s idea of the collective unconscious, Extraverted Intuition is concerned with the collective conscious. People with high extraverted intuition are attuned to current events, media, trends, and developments. The collective unconscious sees the world in terms of primordial archetypes such as The Hero, The Sage, or The Outlaw, etc. The collective conscious used by the Extraverted Intuitive, however, sees archetypes reflected through the subcultures, celebrities, organizations, events, and ideas of their times.

Introverted intuition 
Introverted intuition is the intuition that acts in an introverted and thus, subjective manner. Jung wrote: "Intuition, in the introverted attitude, is directed upon the inner object, a term we might justly apply to the elements of the unconscious. For the relation of inner objects to consciousness is entirely analogous to that of outer objects, although theirs is a psychological and not a physical reality. Inner objects appear to the intuitive perception as subjective images of things, which, though not met with in external experience, really determine the contents of the unconscious, i.e. the collective unconscious, in the last resort. [...] Although this intuition may receive its impetus from outer objects, it is never arrested by the external possibilities, but stays with that factor which the outer object releases within. [...] 
Introverted intuition apprehends the images which arise from the a priori, i.e. the inherited foundations of the unconscious mind. These archetypes, whose innermost nature is inaccessible to experience, represent the precipitate of psychic functioning of the whole ancestral line, i.e. the heaped-up, or pooled, experiences of organic existence in general, a million times repeated, and condensed into types. Hence, in these archetypes all experiences are represented which since primeval time have happened on this planet. Their archetypal distinctness is the more marked, the more frequently and intensely they have been experienced. The archetype would be—to borrow from Kant—the noumenon of the image which intuition perceives and, in perceiving, creates." 

Jung differentiates introverted intuition and introverted sensation by writing that introverted sensation is 'confined' to the perception of events, while introverted intuition instead perceives "the image which has really occasioned the innervation", repressing its actual qualities. He uses an example of "a psychogenic attack of giddiness", writing that sensation will perceive the qualities and sensations of the giddiness without paying attention to the image that caused it. Intuition, on the other hand, does perceives on the image that caused it, perceiving it and its course in a very detailed manner rather than the giddiness itself, which is "the image of a tottering man pierced through the heart by an arrow". 

"For intuition, therefore, the unconscious images attain to the dignity of things or objects. But, because intuition excludes the cooperation of sensation, it obtains either no knowledge at all or at the best a very inadequate awareness of the innervation-disturbances or of the physical effects produced by the unconscious images. Accordingly, the images appear as though detached from the subject, as though existing in themselves without relation to the person.
Consequently, in the above-mentioned example, the introverted intuitive, when affected by the giddiness, would not imagine that the perceived image might also in some way refer to himself. Naturally, to one who is rationally orientated, such a thing seems almost unthinkable, but it is none the less a fact, and I have often experienced it in my dealings with this type."

Myers-Briggs Type Indicator 

Isabel Myers, an early pioneer of psychometric formalized these ideas and proposed that the mixture of types in an individual's personality could be measured through responses to a personality test she devised along with her mother, Katharine Cook Briggs, the Myers-Briggs Type Indicator.  In this model, four "dichotomies" are defined, each labelled by two letters (one for each of the opposites in question), as shown by the emboldened letters in the table.  Individuals' personalities fall into sixteen different categories depending on which side of each dichotomy they belong to, labelled by the four applicable letters (for example, an "ENTP" type is someone whose preferences are extraversion, intuition, thinking and perceiving).

Controversy over attitudes 

Myers interpreted Jung as saying that the auxiliary, tertiary, and inferior functions are always in the opposite attitude of the dominant, though some views differ. In support of Myers' (and/or Briggs') interpretation, in one sentence Jung seems to state that the "three inferior" functions of an (extreme) extravert are introverted. The "most differentiated function is always employed in an extraverted way, whereas the inferior functions are introverted".

More recently, typologists such as John Beebe and Linda Berens have introduced theoretical systems in which all people possess eight functions—equivalent to the four functions as defined by Jung and Myers but in each of the two possible attitudes—with the four in the opposite attitude to that measured known as the "shadow functions", residing largely in the unconscious.

Furthermore, the evidence given by Myers for the orientation of the auxiliary function relies on the sentence from Jung:

"For all the types met with in practice, the rule holds good that besides the conscious, primary function there is a relatively unconscious, auxiliary function which is in every respect different from the nature of the primary function."

Different models 

The tables below give different theorists' ideas about personality types in terms of "cognitive functions".

Carl Jung 

Carl Jung developed the theory of cognitive processes in his book Psychological Types in which he defined only four psychological functions which can take introverted or extraverted attitudes, as well as a judging (rational) or perceiving (irrational) attitude determined by the primary function (judging if thinking or feeling, and perceiving if sensation or intuition). He used the terms dominant, auxiliary, and inferior, in which there is one dominant function, two auxiliary functions, and one inferior function. Each individual follows a "general attitude of consciousness" in which the function is conscious. The more conscious a function is, the higher the tendency and potential it has to develop. The less differentiation is hence strongly affected by the opposing attitude of the unconscious, and manifest in "happening" to the person and not under conscious control. Therefore, there is a significant difference between Jung and the MBTI regarding the orientation of the functions.

The following table is a summarized model of Jung's conception of personality types based on the four functions, introversion, and extraversion.

Isabel Myers 

The third edition of the MBTI Manual lists the types function order according to the table below:

John Beebe 

Though John Beebe has not published a type table, the format that Isabel Myers devised can also be applied to his theory.  Beebe describes the different cognitive functions' role in the overall personality in terms of various mythic archetypes. John Beebe's model is based on Jung's theory of the collective unconscious, which is not part of the current scientific consensus and may be unfalsifiable.

Linda Berens 

The layout of Linda Berens's type table is unique and her terminology differs from that of Beebe; however, the ordering of cognitive processes in her and Beebe's models are the same.

Lenore Thomson 

Lenore Thomson offers yet another model of the cognitive functions. In her book, Personality Type: An Owners Manual, Thomson advances a hypothesis of a modular relationship of the cognitive functions paralleling left-right brain lateralization. In this approach the Judging functions are in the front-left and back-right brain and the Perception functions in the back-left and front-right brain. The extraverted functions are in the front of the brain, while the introverted functions are in the back of the brain. The order of the cognitive functions are then determined not by an archetypal hierarchy (as supposed by Beebe) but by an innate brain lateralization preference.

References

Further reading 
 
 Myers, Isabel Myers (1995) [1980]. Gifts Differing, Palo Alto, C.A.: Davies-Black Publishing. .
 Thompson, Henry L (1996). Jung's Function-Attitudes Explained, Watkinsville, GA.: Wormhole Publishing. .
 Nardi, Dario (2005). "8 Keys to Self-Leadership From Awareness To Action", Huntington Beach, CA :Unite Business Press. .
 Thomson, Lenore (1998). Personality Type: An Owners Manual, Boston & London: Shambhala Publications, Inc. .

External links 
 Center for Applications of Psychological Type website
 8 Cognitive Processes website

Personality tests
Analytical psychology
Carl Jung